Brough railway station serves the town of Brough in the East Riding of Yorkshire, England. It is managed by TransPennine Express, and also served by Northern, Hull Trains and London North Eastern Railway.

The station was originally opened by the Hull and Selby Railway in 1840 and at one time had four tracks passing through. The course of the additional outer tracks (and the two disused platform faces) are still visible, although these were removed in the early 1970s.

Facilities
There is a ticket office inside the main building which is staffed each day from start of service until 19:45 (18:30 on Sundays) and there is a self-service ticket machine (card only) outside the door available 24 hours a day. There is also a vending machine and a refreshment stall open each morning. There is a waiting room on each platform and step-free access to both is available (to platform 2 via ramps onto the footbridge).  Automated public address announcements and digital display screens were upgraded by TransPennine Express in 2017. Free Wi-Fi is also being introduced to the station.

There is a pay and display car park located north and south of the station, whilst Brough centre and bus services are a short walk from the station.

Services
All services on the various routes out of Hull call at the station, giving it good links with many towns and cities in the rest of Yorkshire. There are also a number of through trains each day to and from London King's Cross, courtesy of Hull Trains (seven departures each day) and London North Eastern Railway. (one morning service outbound, returning in the evening).

Sunday sees an hourly service to Sheffield and every two hours to York & Manchester (with some extra trains in the afternoon).  There are now also a few through trains to Scarborough all year since the December 2009 timetable change.

Northern has promised to introduce an additional hourly service between Leeds and Bridlington. Service frequency improvements will also be implemented on the York & Sheffield routes both on weekdays and on Sundays as part of the new franchise agreement.  The additional Northern service (from Hull to Halifax via Leeds and Bradford Interchange) began at the 2019 winter timetable change.

As of December 2019, the typical off-peak service pattern is as follows:

TransPennine Express

 1tph - Manchester Piccadilly via Leeds
 1tph - Hull

Northern

 4tph - Hull (2tph continues beyond Hull to Bridlington or Scarborough via the Yorkshire Coast Line)
 2tph - Doncaster via Goole (or Selby; one fast, one stopping).  Express service continues to Sheffield.
 1tph - York
 1tph - Halifax via Leeds

Hull Trains

 1tp2h - London Kings Cross via Selby and Doncaster
 1tp2h - Hull with 1tpd continuing to Beverley (via the Yorkshire Coast Line)

London North Eastern Railway

 1tpd - London Kings Cross via Doncaster
 1tpd - Hull

Gallery

References

External links 

Railway stations in the East Riding of Yorkshire
DfT Category E stations
Former Hull and Selby Railway stations
Railway stations in Great Britain opened in 1840
Railway stations served by Hull Trains
Northern franchise railway stations
Railway stations served by TransPennine Express
Railway stations served by London North Eastern Railway